Petra Walczewski  (born 27 April 1968) is a road cyclist from Switzerland. She represented her nation at the 1992 Summer Olympics in the women's road race.

References

External links
 profile at sports-reference.com

Swiss female cyclists
Cyclists at the 1992 Summer Olympics
Olympic cyclists of Switzerland
Living people
Place of birth missing (living people)
1968 births